The Three Sisters are three islands in the Vigilant Channel of the Torres Strait,  Queensland, Australia. The islands are, from north to south, Bet Islet, Sue Islet and Poll Islet. The islands are within the Torres Strait Island Region local government area.

See also

 List of Torres Strait Islands
 List of islands of Australia

References

Torres Strait Islands